Jack Hunt may refer to:
 Jack Hunt (American football) (born 1981), American football safety
 Jack Hunt (RAF officer) (1899–1954), English World War I flying ace
 Jack Hunt (footballer) (born 1990), English footballer for Bristol City
 Jack Hunt (politician) (1922–2020), American dentist and politician

See also
 Jack Hunt School, a school in Netherton, Peterborough, United Kingdom
 John Hunt (disambiguation)